The Utah Department of Human Services is a state agency of Utah, headquartered in Salt Lake City. It provides services to children and other groups.

Divisions
 Utah Division of Juvenile Justice Services

References

External links

 Utah Department of Human Services

Human services
Human Services